Dominik Kramár (born 6 September 1988) is a Slovak former professional ice hockey defenceman.

Career
Kramár played in junior level for HK Poprad, HK 31 Kežmarok and HC Košice between 2003 and 2008. He also had two loan spells with Slovak 1. Liga side HK Trebisov and also played one game for HC Košice's senior team during the 2007–08 season. Kramár then spent the 2008–09 season in the Czech Republic, playing in the Czech 1. Liga for SK Kadaň and in the Czech 2. Liga for HC Klášterec nad Ohří.

In 2009, Kramár returned to his hometown team HK Poprad and spent the next four seasons with the team before moving to HC 46 Bardejov of the Slovak 1. Liga. In 2014, he joined Ferencvárosi TC of the MOL Liga, playing sixteen games before finishing the season with Rapaces de Gap in the French Ligue Magnus.

On 14 June 2016, Kramár joined fellow Ligue Magnus team Lions de Lyon. He then spent the next two seasons playing for French teams Boxers de Bordeaux and Brûleurs de Loups. On 24 April 2019, Kramár returned to HK Poprad.

References

External links

1988 births
Living people
Slovak ice hockey defencemen
Sportspeople from Poprad
HC Košice players
Sportovní Klub Kadaň players
HK Poprad players
MHK Kežmarok players
Ferencvárosi TC (ice hockey) players
Rapaces de Gap players
LHC Les Lions players
Boxers de Bordeaux players
Brûleurs de Loups players
MHk 32 Liptovský Mikuláš players
HK 2016 Trebišov players
Slovak expatriate ice hockey players in the Czech Republic
Expatriate ice hockey players in Hungary
Expatriate ice hockey players in France
Slovak expatriate sportspeople in France
Slovak expatriate sportspeople in Hungary